National Progressive Party may refer to:

 National Progressive Party (Carniola), Austria-Hungary, 1894 - after 1918
 National Progressive Party (Finland), 1918–1951
 National Progressive Party (Greece), founded 1950; see List of political parties in Greece
 National Progressive Party (Kiribati), fl.2003
 National Progressive Party (Laos), 1950–1958
 National Progressive Party (Lesotho), fl.2002
 National Progressive Party (Montserrat), founded before 1991
 National Progressive Party (Namibia), founded 1988
 National Progressive Party (New South Wales), Australia, 1913
 National Progressive Party (Panama), 1959–1968
 National Progressive Party (Sint Maarten), Netherlands Antilles, fl.2002
 National Progressive Party (Zambia), Zambia, fl.1964

See also
 Progressive Party (disambiguation)
 Progressive National Party (disambiguation)
 National Party (disambiguation)